Palaniswami is an Indian surname. Notable people with the surname include:

Edappadi K. Palaniswami (born 1954), Indian politician
Marimuthu Palaniswami, Australian computer scientist

Indian surnames